Pope Clement XIV (r. 1769–1774) created 16 cardinals in twelve consistories.

18 December 1769

 Paulo de Carvalho de Mendoça

29 January 1770

 Mario Marefoschi

6 August 1770

 João Cosme da Cunha

10 September 1770

 Scipione Borghese
 Giovanni Battista Rezzonico

12 December 1770

 Antonio Casali
 Pasquale Acquaviva d'Aragona

17 June 1771

 Antonio Eugenio Visconti
 Bernardino Giraud

23 September 1771

 Innocenzo Conti

16 December 1771

 Charles-Antoine de La Roche-Aymon

14 December 1772

 Leopold Ernst von Firmian

15 March 1773

 Gennaro Antonio de Simone

19 April 1773

 Francesco Carafa di Trajetto
 Francesco Saverio de Zelada

26 April 1773
Clement named two cardinals at this consistory and created another eleven cardinals in pectore. He died without announcing their names and their appointments lapsed.
 Giovanni Angelo Braschi
 Francesco D'Elci

References

Additional sources

Clement XIV
College of Cardinals
18th-century Catholicism